The St Johns Eagles is an Australian rugby league football club based in Punchbowl, New South Wales, formed in 1954. They currently play in the Sydney Combined Competition and Canterbury-Bankstown Bulldogs district  junior league.

The club currently runs 28 age-group teams.  In 2017, the club was embroiled in controversy as it emerged that an 8-year-old boy who played for the club appeared to be twice as big as some of the other children he was playing against.

See also

List of rugby league clubs in Australia

References

External links

Ron Massey Cup
Rugby league teams in Sydney
Rugby clubs established in 1954
1954 establishments in Australia